Vanis Kvabebi is a cave monastery in Samtskhe-Javakheti region of Georgia near Aspindza town and the more famous cave city of Vardzia. The complex dates from 8th century and consists of a defensive wall built in 1204 and a maze of tunnels running on several levels in the side of the mountain.

There are also two churches in the complex. A newer stone church that is in quite good shape stands near the top of the wall, and a smaller, domed church that clings to the rock on the level of the highest tunnels

See also

 Culture of Georgia
 Vardzia cave city

Georgian Orthodox monasteries
Caves of Georgia (country)
Buildings and structures in Samtskhe–Javakheti
Immovable Cultural Monuments of National Significance of Georgia
Cave monasteries